The 2012 AFC Futsal Championship qualification was held in late 2011 and early 2012 to determine 12 spots to the final tournament in United Arab Emirates. The teams finishing first, second and third in the 2010 AFC Futsal Championship, and the host nation for the 2012 competition, receive automatic byes to Finals.

System 
Twenty-seven teams registered in qualifying action for 12 places in the finals. Reigning champions Iran, runners-up Uzbekistan, Japan and 2012 edition hosts UAE have direct entry into the tournament proper.

Qualified teams

Zones

ASEAN 
This zone was originally scheduled to take place from November 26 to December 1, 2011.  However, the AFC announced on November 9 that it would be postponed due to the flood situation in Bangkok.  It has been rescheduled from February 21 to 26, 2012.

All times are Indochina Time (ICT) – UTC+7

Group stage

Group A

Group B

Knockout stage

Semi-finals

Third place play-off

Final

East 
Matches played in Malaysia from November 13 to November 18, 2011.
All times are Malaysia Time (MYT) – UTC+8.

Group stage

Group A

Group B

Knockout stage

Semi-finals

Third place play-off

Final

South & Central 
This zone was originally scheduled to take place from November 25 to 27, 2011 in Ashgabat, Turkmenistan.  However, the Maldives withdrew in early November and the AFC Futsal Committee decided to award automatic qualification to the remaining teams; Kyrgyzstan, Tajikistan and Turkmenistan.

West 
The matches will be played in Kuwait from December 9 to December 16, 2011.

Group stage

Group A

Group B

Knockout stage

Semi-finals

Third place play-off

Final

References

External links
 Official Page

AFC Futsal Championship qualification
Qualification
Qualification
International futsal competitions hosted by Thailand
International futsal competitions hosted by Malaysia
International futsal competitions hosted by Kuwait